People Mountain People Sea (人山人海, Rén shān rén hǎi) is a 2011 Chinese film directed by Cai Shangjun. It was selected for the main competition at the 68th Venice International Film Festival.

Cast
 Chen Jianbin as Tie
 Tao Hong as Tianxin, Tie's ex-girlfriend who bore his illegitimate son
 Wu Xiubo as Xiao Qiang, criminal who killed Tie's brother

Versions
The film was released in two different versions in China and abroad. In the domestic (censored) version, Xiao Qiang was caught by the police (he escaped from a medical clinic after being beaten) while the other miners were all rescued by the police following the explosion. This version ends with police officers instructing Tie to obey the laws. In the international version, Xiao Qiang was bludgeoned to death underground by fellow miners, and the other miners (except for the boy) all died in the final explosion.

References

External links
 

Chinese crime thriller films
Films directed by Cai Shangjun
Films set in Guizhou
Films shot in Guizhou